The Winship-Smernes Building, at 948 Main St. in Napa, California, was built in 1888.  It was designed by Napa architect Luther Turton in Italianate style.  It was listed on the National Register of Historic Places in 1977.

It has also been known as the Hennessey Building.

The National Register nomination document from 1977 should be available online, but in 2019 only the accompanying photo is found.

References

National Register of Historic Places in Napa County, California
Italianate architecture in California
Buildings and structures completed in 1888